Aldeanueva de Cameros is a village in the municipality of Villanueva de Cameros, in the province and autonomous community of La Rioja, Spain. As of 2018 had a population of 11 people.

References

Populated places in La Rioja (Spain)